The University of Western Australia (UWA) is a public research university in the Australian state of Western Australia. The university's main campus is in Perth, the state capital, with a secondary campus in Albany and various other facilities elsewhere.
UWA was established in 1911 by an act of the Parliament of Western Australia and began teaching students two years later. It is the sixth-oldest university in Australia and was Western Australia's only university until the establishment of Murdoch University in 1973. Because of its age and reputation, UWA is classed one of the "sandstone universities", an informal designation given to the oldest university in each state. The university also belongs to several more formal groupings, including the Group of Eight and the Matariki Network of Universities. In recent years, UWA has generally been ranked either in the bottom half or just outside the world's top 100 universities, depending on the system used.
Another defining characteristic of UWA is that it has retained its Convocation as an integral part of its governance structure. All graduates of UWA are automatically life-long members of the university through Convocation which grants them the right to attend the Annual General Meetings, to elect two members of the UWA Senate and to review any changes to University legislation. Graduates of UWA include one Prime Minister of Australia (Bob Hawke), five Justices of the High Court of Australia (including one Chief Justice, Robert French, now Chancellor), one Governor of the Reserve Bank (H. C. Coombs), various federal cabinet ministers, and seven of Western Australia's eight most recent premiers. In 2018 alumnus mathematician Akshay Venkatesh was a recipient of the Fields Medal. As of 2021, the university had produced 106 Rhodes Scholars. Two members of the UWA faculty, Barry Marshall and Robin Warren won Nobel Prizes as a result of research at the university.

History 

The university was established in 1911 following the tabling of proposals by a royal commission in September 1910. The original campus, which received its first students in March 1913, was located on Irwin Street in the centre of Perth, and consisted of several buildings situated between Hay Street and St Georges Terrace. Irwin Street was also known as "Tin Pan Alley" as many buildings featured corrugated iron roofs. These buildings served as the university campus until 1932, when the campus relocated to its present-day site in Crawley.

The founding chancellor, Sir John Winthrop Hackett, died in 1916, and bequeathed property which, after being carefully managed for ten years, yielded £425,000 to the university, a far larger sum than expected. This allowed the construction of the main buildings. Many buildings and landmarks within the university bear his name, including Winthrop Hall and Hackett Hall. In addition, his bequest funded many scholarships, because he did not wish eager students to be deterred from studying because they could not afford to do so.

During UWA's first decade there was controversy about whether the policy of free education was compatible with high expenditure on professorial chairs and faculties. An "old student" publicised his concern in 1921 that there were 13 faculties serving only 280 students.

A remnant of the original buildings survives to this day in the form of the "Irwin Street Building", so called after its former location. In the 1930s it was transported to the new campus and served a number of uses until its 1987 restoration funded by Convocation, after which it was moved across campus to James Oval. Since then, the northern end of the building has accommodated the Convocation Council meeting room while the remainder is used for change rooms and meeting rooms as part of the cricket pavilion. The building has been heritage-listed by both the National Trust and the Australian Heritage Council.

Architect Rodney Alsop won the 1932 bronze medal by the Royal Institute of British Architects for his Winthrop Hall. Those who knew him before his death, which occurred later that same year, reported that Alsop had thought of little else but the Hackett Memorial buildings including Winthrop Hall, for six years, and considered the buildings his life's greatest achievement.

The university introduced the Doctorate of Philosophy degree in 1946 and made its first award in October 1950 to Warwick Bottomley for his research of the chemistry of native plants in Western Australia.

Campus 

UWA is one of the largest landowners in Perth as a result of government and private bequests, and is constantly expanding its infrastructure. Recent developments include the $22 million University Club, opened in June 2005, and the UWA Watersports Complex, opened in August 2005. In September 2005 UWA opened its $64 million Molecular and Chemical Sciences building. In May 2008, a $31 million Business School building opened. In August 2014 a $9 million new CO2 research facility was completed, providing modern facilities for carbon research. The Indian Ocean Marine Research Centre, a $62 million research facility on campus, was completed in October 2016.

Arts and cultural facilities 

Many of the buildings are coastal limestone and Donnybrook sandstone, including the large and iconic  Winthrop Hall with its Romanesque Revival architecture.

The Arts Faculty building (first occupied in 1964) encompasses the  New Fortune Theatre. This open-air venue was built to celebrate Shakespeare's 400th anniversary, at the time the only replica in the world of the original Elizabethan Fortune Theatre, and used for 1964 Perth Festival performances. Since then it has hosted regular performances of Shakespeare's plays co-produced by the Graduate Dramatic Society. and the University Dramatic Society. The venue is also home to a family of peafowl donated to the university by the Perth Zoo in 1975 after a gift by Sir Laurence Brodie-Hall.

The cultural precinct of the university is located in the northern part of the Crawley campus. Other performance venues include the Octagon and Dolphin Theatres and Somerville Auditorium, the Winthrop Hall, Sunken Garden, Undercroft and Tropical Grove, which play host to a range of theatre and musical performances, including during the Perth Festival.

The UWA Conservatorium of Music hosts many concerts each year by students and visiting artists, including series of free lunchtime concerts.

The Berndt Museum of Anthropology, located in the Lawrence Wilson Art Gallery (formerly on the ground floor of the Social Sciences Building), contains one of the most significant collections of Aboriginal and Torres Strait Islander cultural material in the world. Its Asian and Melanesian collections are also of strong interest. It was established in 1976 by Ronald and Catherine Berndt.

Libraries 

The University of Western Australia features five libraries on campus, including the architecturally recognised Reid Library building, the largest library on campus. The other libraries are the Barry J Marshall Library (Biological and Physical Sciences, Mathematics, Psychology and Geography); the J Robin Warren Library (Medical and Dental); the Beasley Law Library; and the Education, Fine Arts and Architecture Library.

Residential colleges
Residential colleges and additional student residential buildings located close to the campus include University Hall (formerly known as Currie Hall), St George's College, St Catherine's College, Trinity Residential College and St Thomas More College. St Catherine's College also offers short stays for non-student visitors.

The colleges border each other and  run along the main campus. Students of The University of Western Australia refer to the location of the college, which run along a common road, as "college row." All the colleges are co-ed and host several inter-college events throughout the year, in which residents of the various hostels get to compete against one another in a selection of events. Notable inter-college events include lip dub, in which the colleges compete against one another in a series of lip dub videos, as well as battle of the bands.

Some of the residential colleges  have their own mascots as well. St Catherine's mascot being a cat, St George's a dragon and St Thomas More's a rooster.

Students along college row tend to have short names for each of the colleges and nicknames for the hostels have become a part of the resident culture. St Catherine's College being known as "St Cat's", St Thomas More College nicknamed "Tommy More", St George's College being known as "George's", University Hall referred to as "Uni Hall" and Trinity Residential College known as "Trin".

Offsite locations 

The university established a UWA Albany Centre in 1999 to meet rural education needs. In 2005, Curtin University of Technology joined UWA in Albany to provide additional course offerings to the local rural community. UWA Albany offers postgraduate coursework and research programmes through the Institute for Regional Development and the Centre of Excellence in Natural Resource Management. The UWA Rural Clinical School provides year-long rural placements for third-year medical students in Albany, Derby, Broome, Port Hedland, Karratha, Geraldton, Bunbury, Narrogin, Esperance, and Kalgoorlie; Western Australia. Additionally, the university is involved in the Combined Universities Centre for Rural Health in Geraldton.

The university has further facilities across Stirling Highway in Nedlands, linked by pedestrian underpasses beneath the highway, and paths in front of the residential colleges. Although not directly contiguous with the main Crawley site, the university does own almost every parcel of land between them and has long-term plans to expand the two sites towards each other. The university also has facilities in Claremont, purchased in 2005 from Edith Cowan University. The university prefers to refer to these facilities as "UWA Claremont" and not as a campus. The university remains a single campus institution. UWA Claremont is approximately 5 km west of the main Crawley campus. Further west still, the university also has staff in central Claremont.

Overseas, the university has strategic partnerships with institutions in Malaysia and Singapore, where students study for The University of Western Australia qualifications, but does not operate these foreign institutions directly.

The university has also developed a relationship with Australian Doctors for Africa with whom it sends academic staff to conduct medical student teaching in Somalia, Madagascar, and Ethiopia. There are two to four visits to each location per year.

Centre for Integrative Bee Research 

The Centre for Integrative Bee Research (CIBER) is located on the Crawley campus at the University of Western Australia in Perth. CIBER conducts basic scientific research into honeybee reproduction, immunity and ecology and aligns its work with the needs of industrial and governmental partners.

Academia 

The university's degree structure changed in 2012 to bring together the undergraduate and postgraduate degrees available. Justification for this new system is due to its simplicity and effectiveness in outsiders understanding the system. It is the first university in Western Australia to have this new system. Students entering the university at an undergraduate level must choose a three-year bachelor's degree. The university offers a Bachelor of Science (BSc), Bachelor of Commerce (BCom), Bachelor of Arts (BA) and Bachelor of Biomedical Science (BBiomedSc). , Bachelor of Design (BDes) was no longer offered to non first-year students.

Bachelor of Philosophy
The university also offers the Bachelor of Philosophy (BPhil) course for high-achieving new students. This is a research intensive degree which takes four years because the honours year is an integral part of the degree (most other degrees last three years with the honours year as a separate degree). Students studying the course choose disciplines from any of the four bachelor's degrees. Places are very limited with on average only about 30 places offered to students each year. Thus there is a lot of competition for places and the cut-off admission rank is very high.

Assured entry pathways
High school graduates with high academic achievement are able to apply for "assured pathways". This means they are assured a place in the postgraduate degree for their chosen discipline while they complete their undergraduate degree. Assured pathways are offered for studies in fields such as medicine, law, dentistry and engineering. Prospective students may apply for an assured pathway through the Bachelor of Philosophy. The assured pathways to Dentistry via the Bachelor of Philosophy is the most difficult undergraduate and postgraduate pathway to obtain from the university. Only one place is offered each year.

Postgraduate courses
Postgraduate study is offered in previous-study-related disciplines and in professional disciplines that do not require previous tertiary study in that area, such as medicine, law and dentistry. Masters, PhDs, other doctorates, and other postgraduate coursework are offered to students who meet the academic requirements for undergraduate degrees in the same study area. Examples of this include postgraduate degrees in engineering, computer science and information technology, architecture, and research degrees and doctorates in biology.

Students from other universities may transfer to UWA based on their GPA to undertake postgraduate study. Occasionally, undergraduate students may transfer to the university, based also on their GPA, to complete the degree they have already begun at another tertiary institution.

Scholarships 
UWA offers scholarships to high-achieving students or those who have secured excellent grades in school studies. Some of the University of Western Australia scholarships include:

 Academic Excellence: These scholarships are awarded to both domestic and international students who come out with outstanding results in their academics.
 Diversity, Equity, and Inclusion: These equity scholarships provide opportunities to students experiencing educational disadvantages due to extreme financial conditions.
 Leadership, Talent, and Social Impact: These scholarships have been created for the students who perform well in other activities like cultural events, sports and who have the drive to become influential leaders.

 Global Excellence Scholarship - This scholarship is offered to high-achieving undergraduate and postgraduate students across the globe who have received the admission offer letter from the University of Western Australia. AUD 48,000 is offered to undergraduate students and AUD 24,000 to postgraduate students.
 Global Sporting Excellence Scholarship - The university offers the Global Sporting Excellence Scholarship to high-performing athletes, coaches and officials from across the globe who have received the admission offer letter from UWA. AUD 48,000 is offered to undergraduate students and AUD 24,000 to postgraduate students.
 UWA International Student Award - This aid helps to foster a diverse student community and enables more students from different nationalities to pursue their study and career goals with UWA. Eligible students are given fee reduction of AUD 5,000 per year for their 3 or 4 year degree course.

Students
UWA's student body is generally dominated by school-leavers from within Western Australia, mostly from the Perth metropolitan area. There are comparatively smaller numbers of mature-age students.  In recent years, numbers of full-fee-paying foreign students, predominantly from South East Asia, have grown as a proportion of the student population.  In 2020, the university had 4,373 international student enrolments in a total student body of 18,717.

Academic profile

The university recently attracted more competitive research funding than any other Western Australian university. Annually the university receives in excess of $71 million of external research income, expends over $117 million on research and graduates over 300 higher degree by research students, mostly doctorates.

The university has over 80 research institutes and centres, including the Oceans Institute, the Centre for Energy, the Energy and Minerals Institute and the Centre for Software Practice.  In 2008, it collaborated with two other universities in forming The Centre for Social Impact.

The Zadko Telescope is a one-metre modified Ritchey-Chrétien telescope (F/4 equatorially mounted flat field) used for astronomy research at UWA. The telescope is co-located with the UWA's Gravity Discovery Centre and Southern Cross Cosmos Centre 70 km north of Perth on Wallingup Plain near the town of Gingin. Its operation is harmonised with detection of major supernova events by some of the European Union's satellites. A local businessman, James Zadko, and his family contributed funds for the telescope.

The university also received funding from the State Government for The International Centre for Radio Astronomy Research. The centre is a multi-disciplinary research centre for science, engineering and data intensive astronomy. UWA drove Australia's bid to be the site of the Square Kilometre Array, a very large internationally funded radio astronomy installation capable of seeing the early stages of the formation of galaxies, stars and planets.

The university is one of the partners in the  Western Australian Pregnancy Cohort (Raine) Study, one of the largest cohorts of pregnancy, childhood, adolescence and  early adulthood to be carried out anywhere in the world.

Rankings

UWA is highly ranked according to the Melbourne Institute Index ranking of Australian universities. UWA has been ranked as having some of the highest quality undergraduates of any university in Australia and is ranked second in Australia for the quality of its undergraduate programs.

The Academic Ranking of World Universities (ARWU) produced by Shanghai Jiao Tong University has consistently placed UWA as the joint best university in Australia (along with the University of Queensland) in the fields of clinical medicine and pharmacy. The ARWU has also ranked UWA as the best university in Australia for life and agricultural sciences, coming in at 25th position in the world .

Student life

The University of Western Australia Student Guild is the premier student representative body on campus. It is affiliated with the National Union of Students. The vision of the UWA Student Guild is to be inclusive and representative of the student community and to provide relevant, high quality services to its members, whilst remaining environmentally and socially conscious.

The Postgraduate Students' Association is the representative body for postgraduate students at UWA and is a department of the UWA guild.

The Guild provides a variety of services from catering to financial counselling. There are also over 100 clubs and societies funded by and affiliated with the Guild. The Guild publishes the student newspaper, the Pelican, as well as several other publications and is home to the Prosh charity event newspaper.

Publishing

UWA has had a publishing arm since 1935, when the university was the sole tertiary campus in Western Australia. In 2009 it was renamed as UWA Publishing.

Outskirts

The journal Outskirts: feminisms along the edge is a feminist cultural studies journal which was published biannually, in May and November, from 1997 to 2020. Formerly published by the Centre for Women's Studies, it has most recently through the School of Humanities.

It is a double-blind, peer-reviewed academic journal. It was supported by editorial consultants and independent academic referees from a number of other Australasian universities, including Flinders University, the University of Adelaide, the University of Auckland, Monash University and the University of Queensland. Outskirts began as a printed magazine in 1996, and went online in 1998 as an Open Access Journal. The last edition published was Volume 14, in May 2019.

Its stated aim was "to provide a space in which new and challenging critical material from a range of disciplinary perspectives and addressing a range of feminist topics and issues is brought together to discuss and contest contemporary and historical issues involving women and feminisms".

Notable people

Many notable UWA graduates have excelled in various professions, in particular in politics and government. Premiers of Western Australia have included graduates Alan Carpenter, Colin Barnett, Geoff Gallop, Richard Court and Carmen Lawrence. Former federal ministers include Kim Edward Beazley, his son, former deputy prime minister Kim Beazley, and Australia's 23rd prime minister, Bob Hawke. The former Chief Justice of the Australian High Court, Robert French is also a graduate of the UWA Law School. 
Scientific and medical graduates include Nobel prize laureate Barry Marshall, the Australian of the Year for 2003 Fiona Stanley and the Australian of the Year for 2005 Fiona Wood.  The former CEO of Ansett Airlines and British Airways, Sir Rod Eddington, is a graduate of the UWA School of Engineering.
Graduates with outstanding sporting achievements include former Kookaburras (hockey) captain and Hockeyroos coach Ric Charlesworth. British-born Australian comedian Tim Minchin also attended The University of Western Australia.

Mining magnate Andrew Forrest and Richard Goyder are graduates of UWA.

Current staff of note include clinical psychologist David Indermaur (also a graduate of the university), 2009 Western Australian Scientist of the year Cheryl Praeger, former Western Australian Premier Colin Barnett and former Labor federal minister Stephen Smith.

Gallery

See also
List of universities in Australia
List of official openings by Elizabeth II in Australia
Rural Clinical School of Western Australia
UWA Telerobot
UWA School of Medicine
UWA Business School

References

Further reading
 Special University Number  Western Mail, 21 April 1932, at Trove An extensive supplement commemorating the opening of the university's Crawley campus. See pages 3–23, 33-43 and 77 (back cover page)
 Brief history of the early campus
 The Hackett Memorial Buildings at The University of Western Australia, by John Melville-Jones, Hesperian Press 2012.

External links

UWA Student Guild

 
Educational institutions established in 1911
1911 establishments in Australia
Crawley, Western Australia
Group of Eight (Australian universities)